Stephen Christopher Rowbotham (born 11 November 1981, in Swindon) is a British rower. He competed at the 2008 Summer Olympics, where he won a bronze medal in double sculls. In 2012, the quadruple sculls boat he was in finished in 5th place.

Rowbotham was educated at Clifton College and Durham University where he switched from tennis to rowing. He graduated from Durham in 2003 with a Bachelor of Arts degree in Business Economics.

References

People educated at Clifton College
Living people
English male rowers
British male rowers
Olympic bronze medallists for Great Britain
Olympic rowers of Great Britain
Rowers at the 2008 Summer Olympics
Rowers at the 2012 Summer Olympics
Sportspeople from Swindon
Alumni of Collingwood College, Durham
1981 births
Olympic medalists in rowing
Medalists at the 2008 Summer Olympics
World Rowing Championships medalists for Great Britain
Durham University Boat Club rowers